PK (born on 03/07/1989 as Joosep Vau) is an Estonian musician. He is known as one of the most diverse artists in Estonia and is the founder of the "Parema Elu Nimel" movement in Estonia, which advocates the right to spiritual freedom without prejudice regardless of personal status or interests.

Since 2020 PK has created music bilingually in both English and Estonian.

He has been active since 2004 but was on a brief hiatus for a period due to a health condition he suffered in 2007. He has since then appeared in national media talking about the effects on his life and how music has helped him restart.

Early years in music, MC Battles 
PK started his career in music as a battlerapper. In 2004, he released his first single "Tõrje", which featured an instrumental from s'Poom who was a known solo rapper in Estonia at the time and since then has become the frontman of the old school hip-hop group 5LOOPS.

In 2005–2007, PK took part of the annual freestyle rap MC Battle, with several encounters with Põhjamaade Hirm, known as Estonia's best battle MC. In 2006, at the age of 16, PK took part in an invite only battle hosted by Õllesummer which saw the nation's 16 best freestylers go head-to-head. He finished fourth.

Health 
On June 27, 2007, PK suffered a stroke at his home in Tallinn which was nearly fatal. He lost every physical function including the ability to speak and spent a week in the intensive care unit in critical condition under close observation before being released to the general patients ward. From there he was sent to additional 2 months in a rehabilitation centre in Keila, Estonia before being released to go home in the fall of 2007. Since then, newspapers and magazines including "Õhtuleht", "Puutepunkt" and "Kodutohter" have published articles about the events that took place in 2007, resulting in the awareness of youth strokes in Estonia going up noticeably. As an outcome of the stroke, the musician suffers from nerve damage plus physical and psychological symptoms such as the inability to run, anxiety and also a severe lack of balance. In interviews, he has described his anxiety as it "going up to the point of my ears hurting from my own heartbeat." 

After the stroke, he suffered from depression and was diagnosed with PTSD and anxiety disorder, he spent over a year taking prescription drugs Zoloft, Cipralex and Xanax. During this period, he saw several psychiatrists and psychologists but was never admitted to any facility for mental recovery. Years after that, he has been open about taking the medication and ending that treatment in 2009. On March 15, 2013, nearly six years after his accident, PK said in an interview with ETV that he had "gotten over the incident".

There was never a clear cause provided as to why the stroke occurred and it was labelled to be "a combination of lifestyle choices".

SIGNATURE 
In 2008, PK started to release solo projects again as well as forming a rap/pop group SIGNATURE with James Heckert. They released several English mixtapes over the course of their active years. In 2011, the group discontinued and PK turned back to Estonian music. The foreign scene had a big influence on his craft and he was one of the first people to start making new school hip hop in Estonia in the early 2010s.

After SIGNATURE, PK did not make music for the next couple of years. In 2013, he started writing again.

First Estonian albums, Parema elu nimel 
In December 2013, he released PK7F - an independent mixtape of seven songs. At the end of 2014, he released a video for his spiritual anthem "Palverännak" and an acoustic studio video for the same song.

On June 27, 2015, PK released his first studio album Labürint, it was voted as the eighth best hip-hop release in Estonia 2015.
PK was voted as the 15th best rapper in 2016 and the video for "Parema elu nimel" as the 11th best video. The songs success led to his own party series which was held during a period of one year in Suhkrumoll, a bar in the Old Town of Tallinn. "Parema elu nimel" parties were about being united together and blocking out all human prejudice. The party usually featured new school and trap music and hosted a different performer each time. Names who have performed at the party include Okym, Akar, Utoopia, Fofkin and the most known Estonian female rapper Tiiu among others. Suhkrumoll was closed and sold in 2018.

Ideed and Masterhead Records 
On July 9, 2018, Masterhead Records made an announcement that PK would be joining their ranks. 5 days later PK released his EP "Ideed" on Spotify and Apple Music.

Hiatus from performing 
After a show celebrating his 15 years in music and performing at Tallinn Music Week in 2019, PK stated that he would not be performing any more shows for an indefinite period of time. The hiatus was broken in December of the same year, as he gave the only performance of his new album "Amfiibinimene" at the Red Emperor Bar in the Old Town of Tallinn.

Braucieno 
In 2019, the rapper created a YouTube persona called Braucieno. In a 5-episode series he shared the events of 2007 in detail for the first time while also pleading people to seek help for various mental and physical problems. At first the series was supposed to continue on other subjects but ultimately was announced void because PK felt he had "said everything I wanted to say on that channel". On November 20, 2019, PK announced a new album on his Facebook page. The personal project called "Amfiibinimene" was released on November 3, 2019.

4AM & Dress Sexy at My Funeral 
In the beginning of 2020, the musician released "4AM", his first EP which could be described more as alternative emo rap and less conventional hip hop. Few months later, he revealed that he had been working on a Bi-lingual album and leaked information that it would hardly feature any rapping at all. PKs sixth release in five years was called "Dress Sexy at My Funeral" and was released on June 22, 2022. The video single "i think the asphalt hates me" was released on June 7 and got a positive reaction from both Estonians and foreigners. He released the video for "more" a few months later. The video was a compilation of the summer of 2020 with additional staged clips.

The 3 album year 
PK released "Wet Dreams & 911 Calls" at the start of 2021. The EP had strong influences of euro-trance in several songs accompanied by the artists more usual alternative rap sound. The project featured 6 songs with PK calling it a "story of 3 genres", where each genre had 2 songs to represent itself. The syrreal artwork was created by an Estonian artist and designer Marju Lember. Lember has also created designs several times for singles that PK released during 2020. "Wet Dreams & 911 Calls" was voted the 14th best hip-hop album in Estonia in 2021.

On February 14, 2021, PK uploaded a video for his own version of the famous Blink 182 song "Man Overboard" on his Instagram page. The video featured scenes of him recording the song with comical cutscenes. A month later, on March 5, 2021, he released another cover. This time an a capella version of "Make-up Makes Me Pretty", originally performed by 93FEETOFSMOKE, a vocalist and producer from Richmond, Virginia. In July, PK released a piano version of Machine Gun Kellys song "Play This When I'm Gone" with the piano played by YouTuber Sachin Sen.

He released an Estonian song *eemal/ära" on June 29, 2021, which featured vocals from Sume Made - a young acoustic music, lo-fi and alternative hip-hop artist.

On August 30, 2021, PK released a 7-song project called "brother from another struggle", he said on social media that it was "a representation of not the struggles that the world makes us face, but what our own mind makes us face". The song "RSVP" featured vocals from an Estonia-born but Los Angeles raised pop artist SVNDRA.

PK ended 2021 by dropping a 9-song album titled "appear offline. The artist made an Instagram post on December 30, 2021 that read "sometimes i just want 2 log off. but i cant, can i? its fine, the network doesnt work like that". msn had it right the first time. not here, not done either. appear offline. here are 9 naked songs. 2021 was a weird place."

"appear offline" was a fusion between indie rock and rap, with several songs including no rapping at all while others were built to be a singular long rapped verse. Acoustic track "reptile skin" featured an American indie singer Nolan Boerger, also known as Veachwalk. "upgrades downgrades" was a heartfelt rap song dedicated to PK's mother. The final song of the album called "corners" got PK his first recognition in the indie genre with placements on Spotifys indie playlists. There was no distinguishable artwork for the album, it was uploaded with a blank black square with only the albums name written in white in the bottom left corner.

International recognition 
During the first 2 weeks of 2022, PK released a home video for every song off of his album "appear offline". He stated multiple times in social media that once these videos were all put out, a new chapter will begin musically. PK and Sume Made worked together again on their valentines day single pop-punk Estonian single "mesi", which was released on February 14.

On February 16, 2022, PK posted a teaser for his new video single "after eight" on Instagram revealing that it was directed by Kenneth Rüütli - a known videographer and musician in Estonia, who is also a member of the rap-rock group Põhja-Tallinn. Rüütli has directed numerous videos in the local scene for artists including Suur Papa, Artjom Savitski, Merlyn Uusküla, Wild Disease and others. The video was released on February 22, 2022, marking the beginning of PK's "new chapter". Instead of a standard press release, PK issued a heartfelt letter to his supporters where he admitted suffering from a several-year long depression. The letter held an uplifting mood throughout with an ending line of "if you can take it, you can make it", referencing Unbroken, an American war film directed by Angelina Jolie about American Olympian and Army officer Louis "Louie" Zamperini. In the first weeks of the release, it got media coverage and radio play in Estonia, Brazil, Spain, Italy, United Kingdom and US, making it the most successful international single PK had released. Several alternative music blogs, websites and podcasts outside of Estonia including Eat This Rock, noir rock band Edgar Allen Poets and Music Mondays covered the release of "after eight".

The acoustic version of the song was released on March 14, 2022, and featured Sume Made on the guitar.

On April 15, less than two months after his last video, PK released "white pants". A nostalgic-sounding pop-punk song produced by canadian rock musician Jackson Southorn, also known as Jakkyboi.  

Andy Myers (DJ Kenneth A), an EDM producer from Maryland, USA made a synthwave version of "white pants" which was released on May 26, 2022. Myers has won a remix competition held by Talenthouse and got the chance to remix the hitsong "Don't Stop Me Now" by Queen.  

On July 1, PK released the single "superstore", which had the melodic new-school hip-hop elements from his earlier years. It was inspired by the hit single "Broccoli" and the Netflix comedy series "Superstore". It was released at the same date on all the major streaming platforms as the official video for it on YouTube. It was a one-take video filmed in downtown Tallinn. In the press release PK encouraged people to let go of the problems their own mind creates, enjoy the summer and life overall. "superstore" was the first single from PK which was put together in three different countries - it was produced by an American beatmaker Harry Beats and mastered in Germany by Dominik Holond at Protonaut Studios. The lyric video for "superstore" was released on July 24 and featured pictures from PKs childhood alongside meme style fill ins.  

PK announced on his Instagram profile on August 16 that his new single "maybe" will be released in September of the same year and it will be featuring his mom. His mom, who used to be a part of the Estonian band Ruja, was on a musical hiatus for over 30 years before linking up with people in the blues scene and starting performing again.  

The video for the song was filmed and edited by Kenneth Rüütli while almost entirely directed by PK's mother. The song was a mixture of classical music, blues and hip-hop.  

On October 2, PK announced on his Instagram that he will be releasing a cover version of a song by british rock band Placebo but did not state the song title. He followed the post up on October 8, which revealed the song would be "Protect Me From What I Want" from their 2003 album "Sleeping With Ghosts".  

His single "freefall" was released on October 14, 2022. It featured the vocalist of Estonias most-known metalcore band Horror Dance Squad - Karl Mesipuu. It was the first record PK made in that genre and the song got callbacks to Linkin Park and Chester Bennington on social media.  

In December, PK announced the first single of the next year with "eileen" set for January 7, 2023 release.  

On December 12, he released "viimane jõuluöö", a cover version of the song by legendary Estonian punk band Vennaskond. PK has stated in interviews multiple times that Vennaskond is his favorite band and their music helped him through the events in 2007. In a 2022 interview with Nataliez World he said "..and ofcourse my all time favorite - romantic punk band called Vennaskond" when asked about his favorite local bands in Estonia.

The return of the "Parema Elu Nimel" party 
On September 16, 2022, PKs party series made its return in a revamped form. Instead of the trap theme of its previous years, the event had a strong pop-punk influence featuring bands Noodle Charity and pizzafacial. The party also served as a 5 year anniversary of the same named songs release.

Rexius 
In January 2023, PK signed with Swedish music company Rexius Records.

Musical style and influences 
PK is known for mixing numerous music genres and has had albums shared into segments where 1/3 is euro-trance, 1/3 hip-hop and 1/3 acoustic indie. In 2000s he mostly made underground and oldschool hip-hop. During the 2010s he became one of the most forward new-school hip-hop and trap artists in Estonia. His style at the time was often described as melodic pop rap mixed with EDM. While the genre is usually known for having simple lyrics, PK found his own lane partnering club beats with style contradicting serious, angst-filled lyrics. He later started adding elements from rock, punk and emo as his music became a fusion of alternative rock, post-punk, hyperpop, hip-hop, rap rock, pop-punk and electronic music.  

PK has cited Talib Kweli and Atmosphere as the biggest influences in the beginning of his career. He has named Placebo, Belle and Sebastian, Panic! at the Disco, Blink 182, Vennaskond, Idiootsuse Revolutsioon, Twenty One Pilots, Machine Gun Kelly, Lil Peep and Bloc Party as his favorite bands that have had the biggest influence on his life and music. As a kid, he was a superfan of Michael Jackson, Queen and listened to a lot of The Prodigy, Guano Apes and Scooter at his childhood home with his sister.

Discography

Mixtapes 
 "Mastermind" (2008)
 "97 Seconds: A King and a Pawn" (2008)
 "Sound is God" (2009 with SIGNATURE)
 "Alternate Universes" (2009 with SIGNATURE)
 "Can U Hear Me?" (2009)
 "All Out" (2009)
 "PK7F" (2013)

Albums

Music videos 
 "Palverännak" (2014)
 "Palverännak" acoustic studio (2015)
 "Parema elu nimel" (2016)
 "Josephine" (2016)
 "Darth Vader" (2017)
 "Liikluskorraldus" (2018)
 "High Hopes" (Panic! at the Disco cover) 2018
 "i think the asphalt hates me" (2020)
 "more" (2020)
 "pick you up" session @ Kultuuriklubi Baas (2020)
 "play this when I'm gone" (Machine Gun Kelly cover) (2021)
 "makeup makes me pretty" (93FEETOFSMOKE cover) (2021)
 "man overboard" (Blink 182 cover) (2021)
 "after eight" (2022)
 "after eight" acoustic (2022)
 "white pants" (2022)
 "superstore" (2022)
 "maybe" (as featured artist) (2022)
 "protect me from what I want" (Placebo cover) (2022)
 "viimane jõuluöö" (Vennaskond cover) (2022)

References

External links 
 Räppar PK on valmis saanud uue video, mis on stereotüüpsest räpivideost väga kaugel
 Räppar PK sai maha seksika ja minimalistiku muusikavideoga. Kuidas meeldib?
 Räppar PK: "Iga teise eestlase suhtumine on rõve" /
 RÄPPAR PK AVALDAS AKUSTILISE RÄPP-LOO RÄPPAR PK AVALDAS AKUSTILISE RÄPP-LOO
 Insuldi üle elanud noor räppar: ma arvan, et olen sellest üle saanud
 PK – Parema elu nimel (feat. Indreko Anni) @ Dansonn.com Dansonn | Official Beat Store
 Eesti töökaim räppar PK sai maha uue albumiga
 RÄPPAR PK ÜHINES MASTERHEAD RECORDSIGA
First video single from the new bilingual album on Hood Illustrated
PK's new single exceeds expectations
Establishing Estonia - a conversation with PK
"PLEASE CONFIRM": KOLME ŽANRI NING KAHE RIIGI LUGU
http://life.hooliganhamlet.com/2021/01/pk-uus-ep-wet-dreams-911-calls-sisaldab-midwest-emo-popmuusika-ja-hyperpopi-mojutusi/
https://www.anrfactory.com/im-going-home-estonian-rapper-pk-doesnt-want-to-be-stopped-on-stillwater/
Noir Rock band Edgar Allan Poets review "after eight" on their website
PK on Pete's rock news and views
PK talks hyperpop and the "for a better life movement"
"Ideas are bulletproof". PK chats with Metal Digest
https://www.allmusicmondays.com/interviews/pk-2022-interview?fbclid=PAAaarr37xqVFh9lTzIc3u473BZZuzdk-_Wu8JoASl04UsnoShDPGrJd8NFAA
https://kultuur.postimees.ee/7695119/palatist-plaadilepinguni-terviserikke-tottu-konevoimetuks-jaanud-tallinna-muusik-solmis-suure-plaadilepingu

Estonian rappers
Living people
1989 births
Singers from Tallinn
21st-century Estonian male singers
Emo rap musicians